Mianyang Normal University (MNU; 绵阳师范学院) is a teacher's college located in Mianyang, Sichuan, China

See also
 Southwest University of Science and Technology

References

External links
  Mianyang Normal University

Mianyang
Universities and colleges in Sichuan
Teachers colleges in China